Horace Thomas Ludwig Sr. (born 1944) is an American former college and professional basketball coach.

College career
Ludwig played college basketball for the University of Michigan Wolverines for four seasons where he helped to capture two Big Ten Conference titles and a second-place finish at the 1965 NCAA Championships. Over 38 games in four seasons, he averaged 0.9 points and 0.3 rebounds per game.

Coaching career 
Ludwig coached at Lake Superior State from 1970 to 1974.

Ferris State 
Ludwig compiled a 266–172 overall record as head coach of the Ferris State men's basketball program (1981–1995), achieving seven GLIAC titles in his 14 full seasons. Guard Jarvis Walker was one of his players at Ferris State.

He was suspended in 1995.

Europe 
Ludwig had two stints in Europe. On 12 October 1997, Crvena zvezda of the YUBA League hired Ludwig as their new head coach. He coached the club in 16 games. He is the only non–European head coach of the Zvezda. In 2001, he led ratiopharm Ulm in the German 2. Basketball Bundesliga.

Awards and honors 
 GLIAC Men's Basketball champion: 7 (1981–82, 1982–83, 1986–87, 1987–88, 1988–89, 1989–90) 
Individual
 Upper Peninsula of Michigan Sports Hall of Fame: Class 1994
 GLIAC Men's Basketball Coach of the Year: 1982, 1983, 1987 (with Charlie Parker, WSU), 1989 and 1990

See also 
 List of KK Crvena zvezda head coaches

References

External links 
 LUDWIG v. BOARD OF TRUSTEES OF FERRIS STATE UNIVERSITY

1944 births
Living people
American expatriate basketball people in Germany
American expatriate basketball people in Serbia
American men's basketball coaches
American men's basketball players
Basketball coaches from Michigan
Basketball players from Michigan
College men's basketball head coaches in the United States
Ferris State Bulldogs men's basketball coaches
KK Crvena zvezda head coaches
Lake Superior State Lakers men's basketball coaches
Michigan Wolverines men's basketball players
People from Sault Ste. Marie, Michigan
Ratiopharm Ulm coaches
Date of birth missing (living people)